Ruthie's is a restaurant in Portland, Oregon.

Description and history 
Ruthie's operates from a food cart at the intersection of 36th Avenue and Division Street in southeast Portland's Richmond neighborhood. The menu, described by Eater Portland as a "modern spin on Mormon food", has included funeral potatoes, Jell-O, rockfish sliders, a pork roll, a salad with corn, sheep cheese, popped sorghum, and tomato, as well as biscuits, jams, pickles, and desserts. For Valentine's Day, Ruthie's has served shokupan with dino nuggets, ranch powder, and caviar.

History 
Collin Mohr and Aaron Kiss opened Ruthie's in October 2020. Named after Mohr's Mormon grandmother, the restaurant has sourced food from the local farms Farrah Farms, Vibrant Valley, and Wild Roots. In 2022, Ruthie's was featured episodes of the Netflix travel documentary series Somebody Feed Phil as well as Street Food.

Reception 
Katherine Chew Hamilton included Ruthie's in Portland Monthly's 2021 list of "Portland’s Best New Food Carts" and 2022 list of "20 Food Carts that Define Portland Now".

See also

 Cuisine of the Western United States
 Culture of The Church of Jesus Christ of Latter-day Saints
 Food carts in Portland, Oregon
 Mormon foodways

References

External links

 

2020 establishments in Oregon
Cuisine of the Western United States
Food carts in Portland, Oregon
Latter Day Saint culture
Latter Day Saint movement in Oregon
Restaurants established in 2020
Restaurants in Portland, Oregon
Richmond, Portland, Oregon